Robert Charles Totten (February 5, 1937 – January 27, 1995) was an American television director, writer, and actor, best known for directing many Gunsmoke episodes between 1966 and 1971.

Career
In addition to directing, Totten also co-starred in Gunsmoke playing the role of Corley, opposite of Nehemiah Persoff, in the 1969 episode "The Mark of Cain," among other roles.

As director, writer, and actor, Totten is a member all three guilds; the Directors Guild of America, the Writers Guild of America and the Screen Actors Guild.

Awards
Totten was nominated at the 25th Primetime Emmy Awards for Outstanding Writing in Drama - Adaptation for his work on the 1973 television film, The Red Pony.

Death
Totten died at the age of 57 on January 27, 1995, from a heart attack at his home in Sherman Oaks, California.

Filmography
A partial filmography follows.

Director

Film

 The Quick and the Dead (1963)
 Death of a Gunfighter (credited as Alan Smithee) (1969)
 The Wild Country (1970)
 Pony Express Rider (1976)

Television

 The Gallant Men (1962) - S1E13 "Advance and Be Recognized"
 Hawaiian Eye (1962-1963)
 "Lament for a Saturday Warrior" (S4E5)
 "To See, Perchance to Dream" (S4E9)
 "Two Too Many" (S4E16)
 "The Long Way Home" (S4E19)
 Temple Houston (1963)
 "Letter of the Law" (S1E3)
 "Gallows in Galilee" (S1E6)
 "Jubilee" (S1E8)
 "Seventy Times Seven" (S1E11)
 The Virginian (1964) - "The Secret of Brynmar Hall" (S2E26)
 Bonanza (1965)
 "Dead and Gone" (S6E27)
 "A Natural Wizard" (S7E13)
 The Legend of Jesse James (1965-1966)
 Daniel Boone (1966) - "The Gun" (S2E20)
 Gunsmoke (1966–71)
 "My Father's Guitar" (S11E21)
 "My Father, My Son" (S11E30)
 "Prime of Life" (S11E32)
 "The Good People" (S12E5)
 "The Wrong Man" (S12E7)
 "The Newcomers" (S12E11)
 "Saturday Night" (S12E16)
 "Mail Drop" (S12E19)
 "Mistaken Identity" (S12E26)
 "Nitro!" (S12E28 & S12E29)
 "The Wreckers" (S13E1)
 "A Hat" (S13E6)
 "Major Glory" (S13E8)
 "Blood Money" (S13E19)
 "Hill Girl" (S13E20)
 "The First People" (S13E23)
 "Waco" (S14E11)
 "Stryker" (S15E2)
 "A Matter of Honor" (S15E9)
 "Stark" (S16E3)
 "The Scavengers" (S16E10)
 "Jenny" (S16E15)
 "Murdoch" (S16E20)
 "The Lost" (S17E1)
 Iron Horse (1966) - "Cougar Man" (S1E7)
 The Monroes (1966) - "War Arrow" (S1E9)
 The Wackiest Ship in the Army (1966)
 The Lamb Who Hunted Wolves (S1E16 & S1E17)
 Brother Love (S1E21)
 Mission: Impossible (1968)
 The Phoenix (S3E23)
 Recovery (S3E25)
 Dan August (1970) - "When the Shouting Dies" (S1E10)
 Bearcats! (1971)
 Kung Fu (1973)
 "The Tong" (S2E7)
 "The Hoots" (S2E10)
 The Red Pony (1973)
 Huckleberry Finn (1975)
 The Fitzpatricks (1977) - "Say Goodbye to Buddy Bonkers" (S1E10)
 The Sacketts (1979)
 Enos (1981) - "House Cleaners" (S1E7)
 Magnum, P.I. (1981) - "Double Jeopardy" (S2E19)
 The Young Riders (1990) - "The Man Behind the Badge" (S1E21)

Writer

 Gunsmoke (1968) - "Nowhere to Run" (S13E18)
 The Red Pony (1973)

Actor

References

External links

1937 births
1995 deaths
People from Los Angeles
Male actors from Los Angeles
American male television actors
American male film actors
20th-century American male actors
American male screenwriters
American television directors